Ernesto Cisneros Salcedo (born 26 October 1940) is a Mexican former football midfielder who played for Mexico in the 1966 FIFA World Cup. He also played for Club Atlas and he competed in the men's tournament at the 1964 Summer Olympics.

Club career
Cisneros played in the first Mexican league match at Estadio Jalisco.

International career
He made his debut for Mexico in 1965 and earned a total of 38 caps, scoring 13 goals.

References

External links
 
FIFA profile

1940 births
Living people
Footballers from Jalisco
Association football forwards
Mexico international footballers
1966 FIFA World Cup players
CONCACAF Championship-winning players
Atlas F.C. footballers
Club Atlético Zacatepec players
Atlante F.C. footballers
Liga MX players
Atlas F.C. managers
Olympic footballers of Mexico
Footballers at the 1964 Summer Olympics
Mexican football managers
Mexican footballers